Tioga station is an elevated rapid transit station on the SEPTA Market–Frankford Line in Philadelphia, Pennsylvania. It is located at the intersection of Kensington Avenue, Tioga Street, and K Street in the Harrowgate neighborhood of the city. The station is also served by SEPTA City Bus routes 3 and 89.

History

Tioga is part of the Frankford Elevated section of the line, which began service on November 5, 1922.

Between 1988 and 2003, SEPTA undertook a $493.3 million reconstruction of the  Frankford Elevated. Most of Tioga station was completely rebuilt on the site of the original station, though the eastbound platform exit uses an component of the original station. The reconstruction project included new platforms, elevators, windscreens, and overpasses, and the station now meets ADA accessibility requirements. The line had originally been built with track ballast and was replaced with precast sections of deck, allowing the station (and the entire line) to remain open throughout the project.

During the Market–Frankford's rush-hour skip-stop service pattern, Tioga was only served by "A" trains. This practice was discontinued on February 24, 2020.

Station layout
Access to the station from street level is west of the five-way intersection, situated between East Tioga Street and K Street. There is also an exit-only staircase from the eastbound platform to an area south of the intersection, situated between East Tioga Street and Kensington Avenue in Harrowgate Park.

References

External links

Images at NYCSubway.org
Station entrance from Google Maps Street View
Station exit from Google Maps Street View

SEPTA Market-Frankford Line stations
Railway stations in Philadelphia
Railway stations in the United States opened in 1922